Puerto Rico Highway 578 (PR-578) is tertiary state highway in Ponce, Puerto Rico. The road runs from east to west, parallel to PR-1, and it forms the boundary between the northern end of barrio Bucaná and the southern end of barrio Sabanetas. The road is located entirely within the municipality of Ponce.

Major intersections

See also

 List of highways in Ponce, Puerto Rico
 List of highways numbered 578

References

External links

 
 Guía de Carreteras Principales, Expresos y Autopistas 

578
Roads in Ponce, Puerto Rico